Queijo de Cabra Transmontano (Transmontano Goat's Cheese) is a type of cheese made from goat milk (goat cheese) from Alto Trás-os-Montes, Norte Region, Portugal. It has a Protected designation of origin (PDO) and is listed on the Ark of Taste.

References

Cheeses with designation of origin protected in the European Union
Portuguese products with protected designation of origin
Portuguese cheeses